Priscilla Shirer (born December 31, 1974) is an American author, motivational speaker, actress, and Christian media personality, and evangelist. Her father is Dallas mega-church pastor Tony Evans and her brother is musician Anthony Evans.

Biography
The daughter of Tony Evans, senior pastor of Oak Cliff Bible Fellowship Church in Dallas, Texas, Priscilla grew up well acquainted with the Bible. As a freshman at the University of Houston, she interned with a Christian radio station. Soon listeners were calling the station, inviting Priscilla to speak at their Bible study groups and other events. Soon she was invited to lead a weekly Bible study at the Zig Ziglar Corporation and then to join its speaker team. Priscilla has worked as an independent contractor for CBS and hosted a local television show, but recently she has focused solely on Christian ministry opportunities. She calls Anne Graham Lotz, daughter of evangelist Rev. Billy Graham, her mentor in ministry.

Together the Shirers established Going Beyond Ministries, a speaking bureau featuring Priscilla. The parents of three young boys, the Shirers share ministry and family responsibilities. While Priscilla continues to minister full-time, Jerry manages his schedule and other business aspects of Going Beyond Ministries.

Priscilla speaks around the world at churches and other events, including the LifeWay Christian Resources-sponsored Going Beyond conference and Deeper Still: The Event, where she shares the stage with Beth Moore and Kay Arthur. She has also authored several books.

Shirer graduated from Duncanville High School and Dallas Theological Seminary, earning a master's degree from the latter in Biblical Studies.

In 1993, Shirer was a freshman at the University of Houston. Shirer was married in 1999 to Jerry Shirer, former Hilton Hotels executive. The couple has three sons.

In 2013, Shirer was a speaker at the 2013 Women of Faith conference. In 2015, Shirer made her film debut in the Kendrick Brothers film War Room. In October 2016, Shirer was recognized as one of four prominent women of faith during the 10th anniversary of God's Leading Ladies Life Enrichment Program at The Potter's House. Shirer also featured at the 47th GMA Dove Awards.

Bibliography
"Fervent; A Woman's Battle Plan for Serious, Specific and Strategic Prayer",  
He Speaks to Me: Preparing to Hear from God, 
Discerning the Voice of God: How to Recognize When God Speaks, 
And We Are Changed: Encounters with a Transforming God, 
A Jewel in His Crown: Rediscovering Your Value as a Woman of Excellence, 
The Resolution for Women,

Filmography
 War Room (2015), as Elizabeth Jordan
 I Can Only Imagine (2018), as Mrs. Fincher, Bart Millard's teacher
 Overcomer (2019), as Principal Olivia Brooks, mentor to Hannah Scott

References

External links
 Get to Know Priscilla
 
https://www.goingbeyond.com/

American Christian writers
American motivational speakers
Women motivational speakers
American film actresses
21st-century American actresses
African-American Christians
African-American actresses
African-American women writers
African-American writers
Duncanville High School alumni
Dallas Theological Seminary alumni
University of Houston alumni
The New York Times people
Living people
1974 births
People from Dallas
American women non-fiction writers
21st-century African-American women
21st-century African-American people
20th-century African-American people
20th-century African-American women